Eastern Palm University is a Nigerian university that opened in 2017.

History 
The university was approved by the National Universities Commission in 2016 and became the 42nd state owned university and the 143 university in Nigeria. It was founded by former executive governor Rochas Okorocha of Imo State.

External links
Official website

Sources

 

Universities and colleges in Nigeria
Education in Imo State
Educational institutions established in 2017
2017 establishments in Nigeria